Spellcasting is a series of three interactive fiction games designed by Steve Meretzky during his time with Legend Entertainment. The games feature the character Ernie Eaglebeak, a student at the prestigious Sorcerer University.

Games 
 Spellcasting 101: Sorcerers Get All The Girls (1990)
 Spellcasting 201: The Sorcerer's Appliance (1991)
 Spellcasting 301: Spring Break (1992)
 Spellcasting 401: The Graduation Ball. This part of the cycle was never created.

Video game franchises
Erotic video games